is the third studio album by Japanese band Wagakki Band. It was released on March 22, 2017 by Avex Trax in five editions: CD only, two music video editions, and two live concert editions with DVD or Blu-ray discs. The live concert editions feature the band's concert at the Nikkō Tōshō-gū 400th anniversary event. In addition, a mu-mo Shop exclusive box set was released, featuring an instrumental CD, both music video and concert DVDs, and one Blu-ray containing both music video and concert sets.

The album features the song "Kishikaisei", which was used by TV Tokyo for their broadcast of the 2016 Summer Olympics in Rio de Janeiro, as well as "Valkyrie" and "Hotarubi", which were used in the anime series Twin Star Exorcists.

Shikisai peaked at No. 2 on Oricon's albums chart.

Track listing
All tracks are arranged by Wagakki Band.

Personnel 
 Yuko Suzuhana – vocals
 Machiya – guitar
 Beni Ninagawa – tsugaru shamisen
 Kiyoshi Ibukuro – koto
 Asa – bass
 Daisuke Kaminaga – shakuhachi
 Wasabi – drums
 Kurona – wadaiko

Charts

References

External links 
 
  (Avex Group)
 
 

Wagakki Band albums
2017 albums
Japanese-language albums
Avex Trax albums